{{Album ratings
|rev1 = AllMusic
|rev1score = 
|rev2 = Pitchfork Media
|rev2score = 6.3/10
|rev3 = PopMatters
|rev3score = 8/10
|rev4 = Stylus Magazine'|rev4Score = B−
}}Fisherman's Woman''''' is an album by Emilíana Torrini, released on 31 January 2005 in the UK and 26 April 2005 in the United States. The songs "Lifesaver", "Sunnyroad" (UK #82) and "Heartstopper" (UK #126) were released as singles.

Track listing
All songs written by Emilíana Torrini and Dan Carey unless otherwise noted.

 "Nothing Brings Me Down" – 3:56
 "Sunnyroad" – 3:04
 "Snow" (Emilíana Torrini, Dan Carey, Jamie Cruisey) – 1:58
 "Lifesaver" (Torrini, Carey, Siggi Baldursson) – 4:00
 "Honeymoon Child" (Bill Callahan) – 3:09
 "Today Has Been OK" – 3:31
 "Next Time Around" (Sandy Denny) – 3:36
 "Heartstopper" – 3:02
 "At Least It Was" – 4:18
 "Fisherman's Woman" (Torrini, Eg White) – 1:51
 "Thinking Out Loud" (Torrini, Liam Coverdale-Howe, Chris Corner) – 3:21
 "Serenade" (Carey, Jeymes Samuel) – 3:37

The Japanese edition has a bonus disc, which has the same tracks as the single "Heartstopper".

Personnel
 Emilíana Torrini – vocals, bellow, creaks, korg
 Dan Carey – guitars, organ, pedal steel, wurlitzer, bass guitar, melodica, glockenspiel, shaker, tabla, bouzouki
 Julian Joseph – piano
 Samuli Kosminen – drums, percussion
  S. Russell – drums (on "Heartstopper")

Charts

References

2005 albums
Emilíana Torrini albums
Rough Trade Records albums
Albums produced by Dan Carey (record producer)
Albums produced by The Bullitts